Luis Acosta may refer to:

Luis Angel Acosta (born 1948), Mexican swimmer
Luis Acosta Mena (born 1994), Spanish footballer
Luis Alberto Acosta